Aleksandr Sergeyevich Tumasyan (born 9 February 1955) is a Soviet and Russian professional football coach. 

His sons Denis Tumasyan, Sergei Tumasyan and Aleksandr Tumasyan are professional footballers.

External links
 Career summary by Footballfacts

1955 births
Living people
Russian football managers
FC Dynamo Stavropol managers
Russian people of Armenian descent
FC SKA Rostov-on-Don managers